Bedlinog is a small village (and larger community) located in The Taff Bargoed valley (Cwm Bargoed),  north of Pontypridd,  north west of Caerphilly and  south east of Merthyr Tydfil in south-east Wales. It is currently in the south of Merthyr Tydfil County Borough, but until 1974 was part of Gelligaer Urban District Council in the county of Glamorgan.

Description

It has a population of around 1,400 people. The combined population of Bedlinog and Trelewis has been recently recorded as approximately 3,140, increasing to 3,277 at the 2011 census.

Name
The meaning of the name is somewhat unclear, but the usual suggestion is that it means the 'house near (the stream) Llwynog'. If so, the first element is a variant of the Welsh 'bod' ('dwelling'), and the second a variant of the name of a stream ('Llwynog') which literally means 'fox'. However, all forms of the name are relatively late (seventeenth century onwards) and show significant variation. During the nineteenth century the name was thought by some to have been formed from the elements 'bedd' ('grave') and 'llwynog' ('fox'), and the form 'Beddllwynog' ('fox's grave') is used by some Welsh speakers today. But it is not the standard Welsh form, and it is clear that 'Bedlinog' was the predominant form used by the area's Welsh-speakers in the nineteenth and twentieth centuries.

Government
Bedlinog village is in the Merthyr Tydfil County Borough, which covers the villages of Trelewis and Bedlinog, but is the only electoral ward within the Merthyr Tydfil County Borough Council area which has its own Community Council.

Sport and leisure
The local rugby union club is Bedlinog RFC, founded in 1971 and a member of the Welsh Rugby Union.

One of the largest climbing centres in Europe less than a mile down the valley was closed briefly in 2008, but re-opened in October 2010.

World War 2

During the Second World War, a German Plane dropped a bomb near a field at Colly Row. Many windows got smashed.

Arts and entertainment 

Many films and TV productions have been filmed in Bedlinog, including the pilot episode of  the 1970's TV series Porridge ('Prisoner and Escort', 1973),   Karl Francis', The Angry Earth (1989), and the TV series ''The Indian Doctor (2012).

Notable locals
Actress  (died 2007) was born in Bedlinog.

Welsh language culture
Bedlinog is home to the Bedroc festival, a major event in the Welsh language calendar which has been held over a weekend in June every year since 2008.

References

External links

Old Merthyr Tydfil: Bedlinog - Historical photographs of Bedlinog
Geograph.co.uk : photos of Bedlinog and surrounding area
Friends of Nant Llwynog Park official website

Villages in Merthyr Tydfil County Borough
Communities in Merthyr Tydfil County Borough